On My Honor is a  Newbery Honor-winning novel by Marion Dane Bauer, first published in 1986. The book is frequently read in the United States as part of the elementary school curriculum.

Plot
Tony first wanted to go to the Starved Rock Cliff to climb but Joel disagrees as someone died last year when he tried climbing it. When Joel is told by his father not to go beyond Starved Rock and to turn back if they get tired, Joel promises, "On my honor." Joel and Tony are best friends despite their different characteristics. Tony, however, changes his mind and goes swimming in the river by Starved Rock. Joel does not want anyone to get hurt, yet he also does not want to seem like a coward in front of Tony. Joel suggests a swimming race in a forbidden, treacherous river, although Tony might not be a good swimmer. Joel ends up winning the race, but when he turns to look back at Tony, he finds that he has disappeared. Tony has drowned in the river they were told never to swim in as he could not swim. Joel tries to find Tony in the river but is unable. Joel calls a nearby car over, and the people inside try to help, but they cannot find Tony.  Then the cops come to investigate the death of Tony. Joel lives with the horrible secret until Joel and Tony's families, plus the police, find out. Joel decides to confess what has happened. Joel's father also feels the blame for Tony's death. He tries to comfort Joel to sleep once the cops leave.

References

1986 American novels
American young adult novels
Newbery Honor-winning works
1986 children's books
Clarion Books books